Hajná Nová Ves is a municipality in the Topoľčany District of the Nitra Region, Slovakia. In 2011 had 332 inhabitants.

See also
 List of municipalities and towns in Slovakia

References

Genealogical resources
The records for genealogical research are available at the state archive "Statny Archiv in Nitra, Slovakia"

 Roman Catholic church records (births/marriages/deaths): 1721-1895 (parish B)
 Lutheran church records (births/marriages/deaths): 1708-1895 (parish B)

External links
Official website
Hajná Nová Ves
Surnames of living people in Hajna Nova Ves

Villages and municipalities in Topoľčany District